Graciela (August 23, 1915 – April 7, 2010) was a Cuban-born American singer of Cuban music and Latin jazz.

Biography
Felipa Graciela Pérez y Gutiérrez was born in Havana, Cuba and raised in the Afro-Cuban Jesús María neighborhood. A pioneer in music as a black Cuban woman in a so-called man's world, she opened doors for all those who followed her. Graciela was the lead vocalist over a period of 10 years in the 1930s and '40s with Orquesta Anacaona, an all-female ensemble, before leaving Cuba for the United States. She performed around the world, recording and sharing the stage with her adoptive older brother, Frank Grillo (known as Machito), who encouraged her to sing. They played alongside Mario Bauzá (originator of the genre of Afro-Cuban Jazz) in the orchestra Machito and the Afro-Cubans. Graciela was known for her tremendous voice, risqué and sassy stage presence and sexy double entendre lyrics. She could sing a smoking guaracha as easily as handling the most romantic boleros. Though her last names were Pérez Gutiérrez, she was known by just one name, Graciela.

She was summoned to New York City in 1943 by Mario Bauzá, when Machito was drafted into the army. She joined the orchestra as lead singer until Machito returned in 1944 and from then on the three shared the stage together until their split in 1975. For thirty-two years, they traveled the United States and the rest of the world and performed at the Palladium Ballroom from 1946 until its closing in 1966. Besides the Palladium, they would perform at the Royal Roost, Birdland, the Park Palace, the Corso and the Apollo Theater on a yearly week-long gig — and many other clubs and theaters in New York. Graciela and the orchestra also performed on a yearly basis in Hollywood — specifically at the Crescendo nightclub. Graciela and the band were also a favorite of the disc jockey Symphony Sid Torin who had them on his weekly program several times a year. They were also the summer headliners in the Concord Resort Hotel, in the Catskills Mountains, for more than twenty years.

They recorded albums in which her best-known recordings include "Esta es Graciela", "Íntimo y Sentimental" and "Esa Soy Yo, Yo Soy Así". In 2006, she was honored with the Latin Jazz USA Chico O'Farrill Lifetime Achievement Award. When she died in New York in 2010 at the age of 94, she was considered "The First Lady of Latin Jazz."

Death
Felipa Graciela Pérez y Gutiérrez died at the age of 94 at New York Cornell-Presbyterian Hospital in New York City at 7:58 am, Wednesday, April 7, 2010. She had renal and pulmonary failure. She was cremated as per her wishes.

Discography
 1952 - Arthur Murray mambo - ¿Dónde estabas tú? - Graciela con Machito y su Orquesta Afro-Cubana
 1961 - Machito at the Crescendo - Machito & His Famous Orchestra, featuring Graciela
 1962 - World's Greatest Latin Band - Machito & His Famous Orchestra, featuring Graciela 
 1963 - Esta es Graciela - Graciela con Machito y su Orquesta
 1965 - Íntimo y sentimental - Graciela con Machito y su Orquesta
 1972 - Eso soy yo, Yo soy así - Graciela
 1976 - La Botánica - Graciela y Mario
 1999 - Sí sí no no - Graciela y Mike Young
 2000 - Cubop City - Graciela con Machito and his Afro-Cubans, Howard McGhee, Brew Moore, Flip Phillips
 2004 - Inolvidable - Candido & Graciela

References

1915 births
2010 deaths
American women singers
American jazz musicians
American jazz singers
Cuban emigrants to the United States
Deaths from kidney failure
Latin jazz musicians
Singers from New York City
Latin Grammy Lifetime Achievement Award winners
Jazz musicians from New York (state)
Women in Latin music
21st-century American women